Mumbai Delhi Mumbai is 2014 Hindi language Indian romance-comedy written and directed by Satish Rajwade for Viacom 18 Motion Pictures. The film, adapted from Rajwade's 2010 Marathi movie Mumbai-Pune-Mumbai, stars Shiv Panditt and Pia Bajpai, and released on 5 December.

Background
Satish Rajwade wanted to create a Hindi film based upon his original film in Marathi. Using his Mumbai Pune Mumbai as the template, he reworked the original film in an attempt to give it a wider national appeal.

Plot
Pia (Pia Bajpai), a typical "Mumbai" girl, makes her first ever day trip to Delhi and agrees to meet a possible match for marriage on her mother’s insistence. She lands in Delhi determined to reject the guy after meeting him because after all, he’s from "Delhi". However, as it turns out she loses her phone while fighting with an auto driver and meets Goli Kohli (Shiv Panditt), a witty "Delhi" boy who grudgingly agrees to help her.  One thing leads to another and they end up spending the entire day together. They fight, they argue, they laugh and share a lifetime of emotions in one day. When they meet in the morning they are strangers with strong biases about Mumbai & Delhi, when they part in the evening, the biases have turned into affection for each other’s quirks and finally, love.

Cast
 Shiv Panditt as Goli Kohli
 Piaa Bajpai as Pia

Soundtrack
The soundtrack is composed by Sawan Dutta & Rohan Rohan. Lyrics written by Priya Panchal & Rohan Gokhale (as Raahi Raahi).  Production released two music videos based upon the film and its music. Titled Entry to Delhi and Raahi Raahi they "show the love-hate relationship between the protagonists."

References

External links
 

2014 films
2010s Hindi-language films
Hindi remakes of Marathi films
Indian romantic comedy films
Viacom18 Studios films
Films directed by Satish Rajwade
2014 romantic comedy films
Films scored by Rohan-Rohan